Lucy Morton (23 February 1898 – 26 August 1980), later known by her married name Lucy Heaton, was an English competition swimmer who represented Great Britain at the 1924 Summer Olympics and won a gold medal in the 200-metre breaststroke event.

Morton was born in 1898 at New Tatton in Cheshire, her father Alfred was in domestic service as a groom.  The family moved to Blackpool and by the age of 10 Morton had joined the local amateur swimming club.  By 1920 Morton held the world record for the 200-yard breaststroke and in 1924 was chosen to be part of the British team at the 1924 Summer Olympics in Paris.  Morton won the women's 200-metre breaststroke race, and became the first British woman to win an Olympic gold medal for swimming in an individual (non-relay) event.

Morton retired from competitive swimming after the Olympics and married Harry Heaton in 1927.  She continued supporting swimming events for the rest of her life serving as a competitors' steward when she was aged 72.  She died in Blackpool in 1980.  She was inducted posthumously into the International Swimming Hall of Fame as an "Honor Pioneer Swimmer" in 1988.

See also
 List of members of the International Swimming Hall of Fame
 List of Olympic medalists in swimming (women)

References

External links
profile

1898 births
1980 deaths
People from Knutsford
English female swimmers
Female breaststroke swimmers
Olympic gold medallists for Great Britain
Olympic swimmers of Great Britain
Swimmers at the 1924 Summer Olympics
Medalists at the 1924 Summer Olympics
Olympic gold medalists in swimming